Lord Patel may refer to:
Narendra Patel, Baron Patel (born 1938), doctor of medicine (obstetrics)

Lord Patel may also refer, incorrectly, to:
Adam Patel, Baron Patel of Blackburn (born 1940), British businessman
Kamlesh Patel, Baron Patel of Bradford, British politician